The Confucian church ( or ) is a Confucian religious and social institution of the congregational type. It was first proposed by Kang Youwei (1858–1927) near the end of the 19th century, as a state religion of Qing China following a European model.

The "Confucian church" model was later replicated by overseas Chinese communities, who established independent Confucian churches active at the local level, especially in Indonesia and the United States.

There has been a revival of Confucianism in contemporary China since around 2000, which has triggered the proliferation of Confucian academies; the opening and reopening of temples of Confucius; the new phenomenon of grassroots Confucian communities or congregations; and renewed talks about a national "Confucian church". With the participation of many Confucian leaders, a national Church of Confucius was established on November 1, 2015; its current spiritual leader is Jiang Qing.

Kang Youwei's national Confucian Church
The idea of a "Confucian Church" as the state religion of China was proposed in detail by Kang Youwei as part of an early New Confucian effort to revive the social relevance of Confucianism. The idea was proposed at a time when Confucianism was not institutionalized, after the collapse of the Qing dynasty and the Chinese empire. Kang modeled his ideal "Confucian Church" after European national Christian churches—hierarchical and centralised institutions closely bound to the state, with local church branches, Sunday prayers and choirs, missions, journals, and even baptisms, devoted to the worship and the spread of the teachings of Confucius.

The large community of Confucian literati—who were left without an organization or an outlet for their rituals, values, and identity after the dissolution of state Confucianism, supported such projects. Similar models were also adopted by various newly created Confucian folk religious sects, such as the Xixinshe, the Daode Xueshe, and the Wanguo Daodehui.

The Confucian Church was founded in 1912 by a disciple of Kang, Chen Huanzhang, and within a few years it established 132 branches in China. From 1913 to 1916, an important debate took place about whether Confucianism should become the state religion (guo jiao) and thus be inscribed in the constitution of China. This did not occur and anti-religious campaigns in the 1920s led to a full dissolution of the Confucian church.

Modern churches and congregations
While Kang's idea was not realized in China, it was carried forward in Hong Kong and among overseas Chinese people. The Hong Kong branch of Kang's movement became known as the "Confucian Academy", while the Indonesian branch became the Supreme Council for the Confucian Religion in Indonesia. Chinese people in the United States established independent, local Confucian churches such as the Confucius Church of Sacramento or the Confucius Church of Salinas.

In contemporary China, the Confucian revival of the 21st century has developed a variety of interrelated ways: the proliferation of Confucian academies, the resurgence of Confucian rites, and the birth of new forms of Confucian activity on the local level, such as Confucian communities. Some scholars consider the reconstruction of Chinese lineage associations and their ancestral shrines, as well as cults and temples worshiping natural and national gods from other Chinese traditional religions, as part of the revival of Confucianism.

Other groups associated with the revival include folk religions or salvationist religions that have a Confucian focus. Ancestral shrines of the Kong family have also reopened, as well as Confucian-teaching churches.

The Hong Kong Confucian Academy has expanded its activities to the mainland, constructing statues of Confucius, Confucian hospitals, restoring temples and sponsoring other activities. In 2009, Zhou Beichen founded the Holy Hall of Confucius in Shenzhen, inspired by Kang Youwei's idea of the Confucian Church. It is also affiliated with the Federation of Confucian Culture in Qufu, a nationwide movement of congregations and civil organisations that was unified in 2015 as the Church of Confucius.

Chinese folk religion's temples and kinship ancestral shrines sometimes choose Confucian liturgy during special occasions (that is called  , or sometimes  ), led by Confucian ritual masters who worship the gods enshrined, instead of Taoist or other popular rituals. "Confucian businessmen" is a recently revived term to identify people among the entrepreneurial or economic elite who recognize their social responsibilities and therefore apply Confucian cultural practices to their business.

Contemporary New Confucian scholars Jiang Qing and Kang Xiaoguang are among the most influential supporters behind the campaign to establish a national "Confucian Church". Jiang Qing is the current spiritual leader of the Church of Confucius.

List of churches
 Confucian Fellowship
 Daode Xueshe
 Kongshenghui
 Kongdaoshe
 Kong Meng Xuehui
 Kong Meng Shengdao Hui
 Mengmutang
 Ruists' Society and Ruist Masters' Society, two modern networks of Confucians in mainland China
 Ruzong Luandao, phoenix churches
 Shengdao, a Xiantiandao branch best known by its corporate name of Tongshanshe
 Shenglishe
 Wanguo Daodehui
 Jiushi teaching, also known by its corporate name Wushanshe
 Xin Rujiao Hui
 Xixinshe
 Xuanyuanism
 Yidan xuetang
 Zongsheng Hui

See also
 Boston Confucians
 Chinese folk religion
 Confucian Academy
 Kokugaku
 Supreme Council for the Confucian Religion in Indonesia
 Religious Confucianism

References

Sources
 
 
 Clart, Philip. Confucius and the Mediums: Is There a "Popular Confucianism"?. On: T'uong Pao LXXXIX. Brill, Leiden, 2003.
 Fan Lizhu, Chen Na. Revival of Confucianism and Reconstruction of Chinese Identity. Paper presented at: The Presence and Future of Humanity in the Cosmos, ICU, Tokyo, 18–23 March 2015. (a)
 Fan Lizhu, Chen Na. The Religiousness of "Confucianism" and the Revival of Confucian Religion in China Today. On: Cultural Diversity in China 1: 27–43. De Gruyter Open, 2015. ISSN 2353-7795, DOI: 10.1515/cdc-2015-0005
 Payette, Alex. Shenzhen's Kongshengtang: Religious Confucianism and Local Moral Governance. Part of: Role of Religion in Political Life, Panel RC43, 23rd World Congress of Political Science, 19–24 July 2014.
Stephen C. Angle. Contemporary Confucian Political Philosophy. Polity, 2012. 
Sébastien Billioud. Carrying the Confucian Torch to the Masses: The Challenge of Structuring the Confucian Revival in the People's Republic of China. On: OE 49 (2010)
Yong Chen. Confucianism as Religion: Controversies and Consequences. BRILL, 2012. 
Ya-pei Kuo. "Christian Civilization" and the Confucian Church: The Origin of Secularist Politics in Modern China. On: Past and Present (2013) 218 (1): 235–264. DOI: 10.1093/pastj/gts030
 Philip Clart, Charles B. Jones. Religion in Modern Taiwan: Tradition and Innovation in a Changing Society. University of Hawaii Press, 2003. .

External links
China Confucian Philosophy
China Confucian Religion
China Confucian Temples
China Kongzi Network
Ruist Masters' Society
Yidan xuetang of Beijing

Articles
 Confucius Church Celebrates Historic Election. KCRA News service about the Confucius Church of Sacramento.

Religious Confucianism
Confucian buildings